Richard, Rich or Richie Hall may refer to:

Sports
Richard Hall (boxer) (born 1971), former World Boxing Association interim cruiserweight world champion
Richard Hall (Australian cricketer)
Richard Hall (English cricketer) (born 1978)
Richard Hall (footballer) (born 1972), English former footballer
Richie Hall (born 1960), American football player
Richard Hall (speedway rider) (born 1984), English motorcycle speedway ride

Music
Richard Hall (composer) (1903–1982), British classical composer
Richard Hall (musician), Jamaican saxophone musician
Richard Hall (organist), English organist
Rick Hall (1932–2018), American record producer, recording studio owner, music publisher and songwriter
Moby or Richard M. Hall (born 1965), American DJ, songwriter, musician and singer

Politics
Richard Hall (politician) (1855–1918), coal merchant and politician in British Columbia, Canada
Richard Edward Hall (1907–1977), Canadian member of the Legislative Assembly of Alberta
Richard Hope Hall (1924–2007), British-born merchant banker, businessman and politician in Rhodesia

Other uses
Richard Hall (archaeologist) (1949-2011), English archaeologist
Richard Hall (painter) (1860–1942), Finnish-born painter
Richard Hall (writer) (1926–1992), American writer
Richard H. Hall (1930–2009), ufologist
Richard Seymour Hall (1925–1997), British journalist and historian
Rich Hall (born 1954), American comedian and writer
Richard Hall (Miami University), a dormitory on the Central Quad of Miami University's Oxford, Ohio campus

See also
Dick Hall (disambiguation)

Hall, Richard